Mohammed Lawal (born 23 September 1939) is a Nigerian footballer. He competed in the men's tournament at the 1968 Summer Olympics.

References

External links
 

1939 births
Living people
Nigerian footballers
Nigeria international footballers
Olympic footballers of Nigeria
Footballers at the 1968 Summer Olympics
Sportspeople from Kaduna
Association football midfielders
Stationery Stores F.C. players
Rochester Lancers (1967–1980) players
North American Soccer League (1968–1984) players
Nigerian expatriate footballers
Expatriate soccer players in the United States
Nigerian expatriate sportspeople in the United States